Seol In-ah (born Bang Ye-rin (방예린); January 3, 1996), is a South Korean actress best known for her leading roles in television series Sunny Again Tomorrow (2018), Beautiful Love, Wonderful Life (2019), and Business Proposal (2022) and for her supporting roles in Strong Girl Bong-soon (2017), School 2017 (2017), and Mr. Queen (2020–2021).

Early life and education
Seol attended Seoul Institute of the Arts where she majored in acting.

Career
Seol made her acting debut in 2015, where she played a minor role in The Producers and Flowers of the Prison in 2016.

She first gained recognition for playing the supporting role in JTBC's drama, Strong Girl Bong-soon and KBS2' drama School 2017. She also made her film debut in a web film titled, Closed Eyes. She was also a host of MBC's Section TV from 2017 to 2019.

In 2018, Seol took on her first lead role in Sunny Again Tomorrow, which earned her the Best New Actress Award at the 2018 KBS Drama Awards. Her second full variety show came soon after, as a fixed cast member of Law of the Jungle in Mexico. She also played a supporting character in the drama Special Labor Inspector in 2019.

Seol played Kim Cheong-Ah in her second leading role in the weekend drama Beautiful Love, Wonderful Life, which ran from September 2019 to March 2020. She received the Excellence Award for Actress in a Serial Drama at the 2019 KBS Drama Awards for her role in the drama.

In 2020, Seol made a special appearance in the tvN drama Record of Youth. Later the same year, she played Jo Hwa-jin (Royal Noble Consort Ui) in historical drama Mr. Queen.

In 2022, Seol starred in the SBS romantic comedy drama Business Proposal as Jin Young-seo. In April 2022, it was reported that her contract with Oui has expired and she decided not to renew it. Later, she signed with Gold Medalist. She released her first ever solo single, "Pure Love", in collaboration with the vegan brand Marhen J. The single accompanied with the music video was released on July 8. In August, Seol made her big screen debut in the film Emergency Declaration as Tae Eun, a flight attendant.

Filmography

Film

Television series

Television shows

Hosting

Discography

Singles

Awards and nominations

References

External links

 
 
 

1996 births
Living people
Seoul Institute of the Arts alumni
21st-century South Korean actresses
South Korean television actresses
South Korean film actresses